The Robert Walters Group is a British recruitment company that focuses on placing professionals into permanent, contract and temporary positions. The founder and CEO is Robert Walters. Established in 1985, the business has offices in 30 countries.

History 
Established in 1985 by its chief executive officer (CEO), Robert Walters, today, the company operates in 32 countries and locations.

Originally established to place accountants in London, the company now recruits across multiple disciplines. In July 1996, it was listed on the London Stock Exchange. A year later in 1997, it set up a wholly-owned subsidiary, Resource Solutions, offering recruitment process outsourcing services.

The company acquired Tristar, an Australian recruitment business in 1997 and merged with US staffing company, Staff Mark Inc., in August 1998. The company demerged two years later, re-listing on the London Stock Exchange in 2000, and that same year won Shares magazine's Best IPO Award.

In February 1999, the company launched its first global salary survey, offering an annual insight into each sector that the company operates in.

In 2001, the company acquired Dunhill Management Services.

In 2005, the company launched a junior professional contract recruitment business in France, called 'Walters Interim' (now known as Walters People. Further Walters People offices opened in Belgium (2006), the Netherlands (2008), Spain (2017), Ireland (2019), the United Kingdom (2019) and Hong Kong (2020). In February 2008, the company acquired Talent Spotter, a Chinese recruitment business with offices in Shanghai and Suzhou.

Operation

Robert Walters 
Robert Walters specialised and still specialises in permanent and contract recruitment across all industry sectors. Operating at all levels of seniority the company finds jobs for workers in the accounting and finance, banking, legal, technology, sales and marketing, HR, support and administration, engineering, and supply chain, procurement and logistics fields.

Resource Solutions 
In 1997, Robert Walters Group established Resource Solutions, a recruitment process outsourcing business. Resource Solutions is an international leader in RPO (Recruitment Process Outsourcing), MSP (Managed Service Provider) and talent advisory solutions. Their offering spans all areas of recruitment, candidate management and technology helping organisations gain control over recruitment activities, while mitigating risk and improving hiring manager and candidate experience.

Walters People 
Walters People is a contract recruitment and junior permanent hiring business with offices in Belgium, France, Ireland, Hong Kong, the Netherlands, Spain, Chile and the UK.

References

External links
Official Website

British companies established in 1985
Companies based in the City of Westminster
Employment agencies of the United Kingdom
Temporary employment agencies
Human resource management consulting firms